Annapurna Games, LLC (trade name: Annapurna Interactive) is an American video game publisher. The company is a division of Annapurna Pictures, and was founded in 2016. Notable games released by the company include Donut County, Kentucky Route Zero, Outer Wilds, Sayonara Wild Hearts, Wattam, What Remains of Edith Finch, Telling Lies, Neon White and Stray.

History
The company was founded as a division of Annapurna Pictures on December 1, 2016 as Annapurna's attempt to expand into the video game industry. The company's early staff was composed of existing Annapurna executives, producer Neale Hemrajani and Technology Head James Masi along with several video game veterans, including Nathan Gary, Deborah Mars, Hector Sanchez, and Jeff Legaspi, who had worked in Sony Interactive Entertainment and Warner Bros. Interactive Entertainment. Jenova Chen also served as the company's advisor. The company aimed to publish games that are "personal, emotional, and original".

On the day of establishment, the company announced several publishing deals it had signed with several independent developers. Some of the first games published by the company included Gorogoa, What Remains of Edith Finch, Wattam, and Florence. In 2017, Annapurna announced that it would begin publishing more games, which included The Artful Escape, Ashen, and Telling Lies.

In May 2020, it was announced that Nathan Vella, former president of Capybara Games, had joined the company as an executive. In October 2020, Annapurna established an internal development studio in Los Angeles.

In March 2022, video game journalism YouTube channel People Make Games reported on three video game studios publishing under Annapurna Interactive — Mountains, Fullbright, and Funomena. In all three cases, employees reportedly reached out to Annapurna Interactive, addressing concerns regarding abuse and a toxic work environment being created by the studio founders. In hopes of getting Annapurna Interactive to mediate, employees stated that the publisher was siding mostly with the founders in question. According to one former studio employee, representatives of Annapurna Interactive had been quoted responding that "without strong personalities, games don't get made." Chris Bratt of People Make Games saw these incidents as part of a greater pattern of auteur culture that can be found across the independent film and video game industry.

Two limited edition box sets containing the games Donut County, Kentucky Route Zero, Outer Wilds, Sayonara Wild Hearts, Wattam, What Remains of Edith Finch, Telling Lies, and Gorogoa, celebrating the first five years of the publisher, were released in collaboration with iam8bit for the PlayStation 4 in late 2020.

Games

References

External links
 

Companies based in Los Angeles
2016 establishments in California
Video game companies established in 2016
Video game companies of the United States
Video game publishers
American companies established in 2016
Apple Design Awards recipients